The 2015–16 WNBL season is the 36th season of competition since its establishment in 1981. A total of 9 teams contested the league. The regular season was played between October 2015 and February 2016, followed by a post-season involving the top four on 28 February to 18 March 2016. The Townsville Fire were the defending champions and they would go on to repeat their run to the WNBL title, defeating the Perth Lynx 2–0 in the final.

Sponsorship included Wattle Valley, entering its third year as league naming rights sponsor. Spalding provided equipment including the official game ball, with Peak supplying team apparel. This season also saw the return of a team from South Queensland with the debut of the South East Queensland Stars.

Transfers

Team standings

Finals

Statistics

Individual statistic leaders

Individual game highs

Season award winners

Player of the Week Award

Team of the Week Award

Player & Coach of the Month Awards

Postseason Awards

Team Captains & Coaches

References

 
2015–16 in Australian basketball
Australia
Basketball
Basketball